Air d'Ayiti was a short-lived airline based in Port-au-Prince, Haiti, which was operational between 1997 and 1999. It operated scheduled and charter flights within the Caribbean and to Miami in the United States.

Fleet
Air d'Ayiti operated a single Boeing 727-200 leased from Falcon Air Express.

See also
List of defunct airlines of Haiti

References

Defunct airlines of Haiti
Airlines established in 1997
Airlines disestablished in 1999
1997 establishments in North America
1999 disestablishments in North America